The Hassan II Mosque is a mosque in Casablanca, Morocco. It is the  largest functioning mosque in Africa and is the 7th largest in the world. Completed in 1993, it was designed by Michel Pinseau under the guidance of King Hassan II and built by Moroccan artisans from all over the kingdom. The minaret is 60 stories high topped by a laser, the light from which is directed towards Mecca. The mosque stands on a promontory looking out to the Atlantic Ocean; worshippers can pray over the sea but there is no glass floor looking into the sea. The walls are of hand-crafted marble and the roof is retractable. A maximum of 105,000 worshippers can gather together for prayer: 25,000 inside the mosque hall and another 80,000 on the mosque's outside ground.

Geography
The mosque is located at Bd Sidi Mohammed Ben Abdallah in Casablanca.  The  complex nestles between the harbor and the El Hank lighthouse.  From the nearest train station at  it is about a 20-minute walk to the mosque. The ten-lane boulevard with shopping avenues has its at the southern facade of the mosque and extends to the gates of the Palace Oued el Makhazine in the middle of the city. The basilical plan of the mosque justifies this layout of the boulevard.

The mosque rises above the Atlantic Ocean. The building is built partially on land and partially over the ocean. This siting was accomplished by creating a platform linking a natural rock outcrop reclaimed from the sea, where the Orthlieb Pool had previously been located. A temporary pier  in length had to be erected to protect the foundations of the pillars from the sea during the construction period. Its environmental advantage is that it is free of noise and pollution and receives a fresh breeze from the sea.

Apart from the mosque, other structures in the area are a madrasa (Islamic school), hammams (bathhouses), a museum on Moroccan history, conference halls, and a very large library said to be the "most comprehensive in the Islamic world." The 41 fountains in the courtyard are all well decorated. The garden around the mosque is well tended and is a popular location for family picnics. The traditionally designed madrasa occupies an area of  including the basement. Two stories in height, it is constructed in a semi-circular shape, with abutting qibla wall and the mihrab section.

History
The historical context of the mosque began with the death of King Mohammed V in 1961. King Hassan II had requested for the best of the country's artisans to come forward and submit plans for a mausoleum to honour the departed king; it should "reflect the fervor and veneration with which this illustrious man was regarded." In 1980, during his birthday celebrations, Hassan II had made his ambitions very clear for creating a single landmark monument in Casablanca by stating:

The building was commissioned by King Hassan II to be the most ambitious structure ever built in Morocco. It was designed by the French architect Michel Pinseau who had lived in Morocco, and was constructed by the civil engineering group Bouygues.

Work commenced on July 12, 1986, and was conducted over a seven-year period. Construction was scheduled to be completed in 1989 ready for Hassan II's 60th birthday. During the most intense period of construction, 1400 men worked during the day and another 1100 during the night. 10,000 artists and craftsmen participated in building and beautifying the mosque. However, the building was not completed on schedule which delayed inauguration. The formal inauguration was subsequently chosen to be the 11th Rabi' al-Awwal of the year 1414 of the Hijra, corresponding to 30 August 1993, which also marked the eve of the anniversary of Prophet Muhammad’s birth. It was dedicated to the Sovereign of Morocco.

Financing
Construction costs, estimated to be about 585 million euro, were an issue of debate in Morocco, a lower mid-income country. While Hassan wished to build a mosque which would be second in size only to the mosque at Mecca, the government lacked funds for such a grand project. Much of the financing was by public subscription. Twelve million people donated to the cause, with a receipt and certificate given to every donor. The smallest contribution was 5 DH. In addition to public donations and those from business establishments and Arab countries (such as Kuwait and Saudi Arabia), western countries provided construction loans, which Morocco repaid.

Architecture and fittings

In the words of the authors of the book Morocco Country Study Guide, the Hassan II Mosque "undeniably marks the continuity of a modernized ancestral art and bears the sign of innovations that are due not only to technical reasons but also to a fertile exploration of new aesthetic possibilities." All of the granite, plaster, marble, wood and other materials used in the construction, were extracted from around Morocco, with the exception of some Italian white granite columns and 56 glass chandeliers. Six thousand traditional Moroccan artisans worked for five years to create the abundant and beautiful mosaics, stone and marble floors and columns, sculpted plaster moldings, and carved and painted wood ceilings. The exterior surfaces of the mosque display titanium, bronze, and granite finishes. It is ornamented with pale blue marble and Zellige tilework. A particular feature in the mosque is that all structures are made of reinforced cement concrete and all decorations are of traditional Moroccan design. The construction work involved engagement of 35,000 workers and working of over 50 million hours. The mosque has capacity to accommodate 25,000 devotees for prayers in the main hall and another 80,000 in the plaza squares around it.

Notable architectural features include the conspicuous columns, the horseshoe arches, and the innumerable muqarnas embellishing the ceilings. The dome, arches and walls give a grand ambiance to the mosque. The first-class sound system is discreetly hidden. The ablution room and a vast public hammam are in the basement, with its own entrance. Tadelakt, a plastering technique which adds egg yolks and black soap into mixed plaster, was used in the hammam baths.

Design
The building blends Islamic architecture and Moroccan elements, and reflects Moorish influences, while featuring an urban design. It displays elements found in other Moroccan buildings such as the unfinished mosque in Rabat and the Koutoubia Mosque in Marrakesh. There are features from an old Roman fort converted into the tomb of King Mohammed V of Rabat. Other elements come from the Tour Hassan Mosque, the Dome of the Rock (also known as Qubbat al Sakhra 688–692 AD), the Great Mosque of Madina (705–710 AD), Kairouan Mosque in Tunisia (663 AD), the Great Mosque of Damascus (705–715 AD), the Great Mosque of Cordoba (785–786 AD), Quarawiyyin Mosque (956 and 1135 AD) in Morocco, the Great Mosque of Tlemcen (1136), and Djamaa el Kebir (1096).  Its layout is known as the basilican plan, which is different from the common practice of a T shaped plan adopted in many North African countries. The qibla wall is perpendicular to the naves which is said to be an unconventional layout, given that it is customary for the rows of worshipers facing Mecca to be as wide as possible rather than extend farther back (Halod and Khan 1997, 61). The adoption of this plan has been described as "a conflict between King Hassan II the ancient aristocrat and King Hassan II the contemporary leader who must develop commerce and industry in order meet the needs of his country."

Prayer hall

The prayer hall is on the top of the mosque covered in windows The central hall is centrally heated, and provides spectacular underwater views of the Atlantic Ocean. The decorations in the hall are elaborate and exquisite made possible by involving 6000 master artisans of Morocco working on it. It is so large that it can easily accommodate the house of the Notre Dame of Paris or St Peter's of Rome. The woodcarvings, the zellij work and the stucco mouldings are of elaborate and highly impressive design; the wood used for carving is cedar from the middle Atlas mountains, the marble is from Agadir and granite is brought from Tafraoute.

The prayer hall is built to a rectangular plan of  length and  width with three naves, which are perpendicular to the qibla wall. The central hall is undulating with a succession of numerous domes from which glass chandeliers, imported from Murano, are hung. On either side of the hall, there are mezzanine floors with carved dark wood furnishings, which are reserved for women. The doors are electrically operated. A "triptyich marble partition with open work and central window flanked by two smaller sized windows" are built on the wall of the façade. Such panels, built with multicolored arches, engraved with ornamented floral designs, appear like a geometrical framework when viewed from the outside. The gates are embellished with marble bars which have faux voussoirs (alternately smooth or sculpted). The pillars of  height are square in shape with engaged columns and cruciform joining a series of pillars. Geometrically shaped polychromatic zellji with carved plaster are noted with floral and geometric designs with epigraphy. Carved or painted marble or shaped wood are used for these elegant designs, which highlight Islamic art forms.

The roof is retractable, illuminating the hall with daytime sunlight and allowing worshippers to pray under the stars on clear nights. The roof is covered with cast-aluminium tiles, (similar to the Fez tiles), stronger and more reliable than traditional ceramic tiles, and about 35 percent lighter. The prayer hall is also illuminated by light from the glass gates on the northern wall.

Minaret

At  in height the minaret is the second tallest minaret in the world. It has a laser beam fitted at the top, which is electronically operated in the evening. The minaret is said to enhance the visual alignment of the boulevard. It is square in shape thrusting skyward. The base to the top width ratio of 1 to 8 (between basement and the summit) has a marble covering on the exterior with austere decoration. The faces of the facade have carved ornamentation with different materials. There are stitches of roudani tracetine on a 100,000 MP surface. This decorative material (with chrome and green as dominant colours), is a substitute for the use of bricks, the material used in many other notable minarets, and has given the mosque an extraordinary elegance. Green tiles decorate the minaret for one third of the height from the top, and then changes colour to deep green or turquoise blue; it is said that in the Hassan II minaret, the designer had used his sea-foam green and God's blue to celebrate the life of a king. The concrete used for the minaret was a special high-grade type, which could perform well under severe conditions of a combined action of strong wind and seismicity. This was achieved by the Science Department of the Bouygues Group, the contractors for the project, who developed an extra-strength concrete four times stronger than ordinary concrete. Called B.H.P (highly resistant concrete), it offers a resistance to compression value of 1200 bars per sqcm (claimed to be a world record) and has a very quick setting time. This enabled the building of a taller structure with due underpinning of the foundation, while adhering to the construction schedule. Cranes were also designed to suit the height of the minaret for concreting.

Hassan II Mosque Museum 
The museum opened its doors to the public after the construction of the mosque. It showcases art pieces from various traditional Moroccan arts as well as unused architectural elements of the mosque, such as carved stucco, painted wood ceilings, and zellij walls.

Restoration works

Structural deterioration in the concrete wall was observed ten years after the mosque's completion. This was explained as being due to exposure to the salt water of the Atlantic Ocean, into which nearly half of the mosque's foundation projects. Salt water migrating into the porous concrete caused the rusting of the rebar steel reinforcements resulting in expansion of the steel and causing cracking of concrete. Salt water had penetrated beyond the steel bar also into the structures.

Effective restoration works were instituted in April 2005. This involved use of moly-grade stainless steel combined with high-grade concrete to make the structure resistant to chloride attack, a process that evolved during 3 years of research. This is expected to enhance the building's life by 100 years. The works were carried out in four phases. In the first phase a leak-proof coffer dam was constructed to isolate and dry the work area. In the second phase, the voids seen in the prayer hall were filled with concrete. In the third phase, the structural slabs and pillars on the exterior part of mosque exposed to the sea were demolished;  of concrete was removed. In the fourth phase, new exterior protection works were built using high-strength concrete with 2205 (conforming to UNS S 32205 EN 1.442 standards) stainless steel rods as reinforcements for effective erosion control. Even though the many structural changes were made as per detailed design, still during execution of works, 100 external pillars, called “combs” because of their wave breaking characteristics, were exposed to salt water and wave action and had to be replaced with new pillars. These were made from high-strength concrete with 2205 stainless steel reinforcements. All of these works involved use of 1300 tons of special steel (with 40 tons of Mo) of  bars with yield strength of 850 N per mm2. The entire work was done at a cost of 50 million euros.

Gallery

See also
 Lists of mosques
 List of mosques in Africa
 List of mosques in Morocco
Islamic art
Timeline of Muslim history
 List of tallest minarets 
 List of tallest mosques

References

Bibliography

External links

 La Fondation de la Mosquée Hassan II
Hassan II Mosque Article from Sacred Destinations
Hassan II Mosque مسجد الحسن الشاني Images from the Manar Al-Athar Digital Photo Archive

Mosques in Morocco
Religious buildings and structures in Casablanca
Mosques completed in 1993
Tourist attractions in Casablanca
20th-century architecture in Morocco